John Clere (by 1479–1539), was an English politician.

He was a Member of Parliament (MP) for Colchester 1512 and 1515.

References

15th-century births
1539 deaths
People from Colchester
English MPs 1512–1514
English MPs 1515